The Fisher Classic is a Canadian two-seat, conventional landing gear, single-engined, biplane kit aircraft designed for construction by amateur builders. The aircraft is a two-seat derivation of the Fisher FP-404. Fisher Flying Products was originally based in Edgeley, North Dakota, USA but the company is now located in Woodbridge, Ontario, Canada.

Design and development
The Classic was designed by Fisher Aircraft in the United States in 1987 and was intended to comply with the US Experimental - Amateur-built category, although it qualifies as an ultralight aircraft in some countries, such as Canada. It also qualifies as a US Experimental Light Sport Aircraft.

The construction of the Classic is of wood, with the wings, tail and fuselage covered with doped aircraft fabric. The aircraft features interplane struts, inverted "V" cabane struts, four ailerons and a semi-symmetrical airfoil. Like the original FP-404 upon which it is based, the Classic has no flaps. The Classic's main landing gear is bungee suspended. Cockpit access is via the lower wing. The company claims an amateur builder can complete the aircraft from the kit in 500 hours.

The specified engine for the Classic is the  Rotax 582 two-stroke engine.

The estimated time to build the aircraft from the kit is 400–500 hours, or 250 hours from the quick-build kit. By late 2011 more than 155 Classics were flying.

Specifications Classic)

See also

References

External links

Official website
Photo of a Classic

1980s Canadian ultralight aircraft
Light-sport aircraft
Aircraft first flown in 1987
Biplanes
Single-engined tractor aircraft